AS Dragon may refer to:
AS Dragon (Guadeloupe), a football team in Guadeloupe
AS Dragon (Tahiti), a football team in Tahiti
AS Dragons, a football in the Democratic Republic of the Congo
AS Dragons FC de l'Ouémé, a football team in Benin
A.S. Dragon, a French rock group